The Committee of the German-Baltic Parties (ADP) was an alliance of Baltic German political parties in Latvia during the inter-war period. Its members included the German-Baltic Democratic Party, the German-Baltic Progressive Party, the German-Baltic Reform Party, the German-Baltic People's Party, the German-Baltic Integration Party, the German-Baltic State Party and the Voters Association of Mitau.

History
The alliance was established in early 1920 as a successor to the National Committee. It won six seats in the 1920 Constitutional Assembly elections. The alliance retained its six seats in the 1st Saeima in the 1922 elections, but was reduced to four seats in the 1925 elections. The alliance returned to its six-seat strength in the 3rd Saeima as a result of the 1928 elections. Following the 1931 elections (the last multi-party elections in Latvia until 1990), they had five seats in the 4th Saeima.

Members of the Saeima

References

Political parties of minorities in Latvia
Defunct political party alliances in Latvia
1920 establishments in Latvia
Political parties established in 1920
Baltic-German people
German diaspora political parties